Onyx Films was a film production business in Montreal, Quebec, Canada. It was founded in 1962 by Pierre Lamy and his brother André Lamy. Their films include Le Viol d'une jeune fille douce ('The Rape of a Sweet Young Girl'), a satire. Gilles Carle worked with the film company on several productions.

The Canadian Post Office and Royal Canadian Mounted Police had contracts with Onyx to make films in 1971.

The 2010 documentary film La vie privée d'Onyx ('The Very Private Affair of Onyx') directed by Denys Desjardins is about the company's history.

Filmography
Pas de vacances pour les idoles ('No Vacation for Idols') (1965)
Le Viol d'une jeune fille douce ('The Rape of a Sweet Young Girl') (1968)
Deux femmes en or ('Two Golden Women') (1970)
Les Males ('The Males') (1971)
La Feuille d'Erable ('The Maple Leaf') (1971), a series directed by Aimée Danis, Gilles Carle, and other
All Ears to Gaspé (1974), a documentary film about Quebec's Gaspé region
Carnaval d'hiver de Québec

References

Canadian companies established in 1962
1962 establishments in Ontario
Canadian film studios
Companies based in Montreal